The 1943–44 season was the fifth season of special wartime football in England during the Second World War.

Overview
Between 1939 and 1946 normal competitive football was suspended in England. Many footballers signed up to fight in the war and as a result many teams were depleted, and fielded guest players instead. The Football League and FA Cup were suspended and in their place regional league competitions were set up. Appearances in these tournaments do not count in players' official records.

Honours
League competition was split into three regional leagues, South, West and North. Many fixtures were unfulfilled.

See also
England national football team results (unofficial matches)

References

 
Wartime seasons in English football